In Baseball statistics, hits allowed (HA) signifies the total number of hits allowed by a pitcher.

See also
Baseball statistics

Pitching statistics